Polyascidae is a family of parasitic barnacles in the class Thecostraca. There are at least two genera and about eight described species in Polyascidae.

Genera
These genera belong to the family Polyascidae:
 Parasacculina Høeg & Glenner, 2019
 Polyascus Glenner, Lützen & Takahashi, 2003

References

Further reading

 

Barnacles